The Kaffee Burger is an artistic restaurant and club on Torstraße in Berlin-Mitte, Germany.

History 
The restaurant has existed since 1890. The restaurant continued to be run as a private company in the GDR. Since the 1970s, the Kaffee Burger became popular in East Berlin, with Volksbühne making a significant contribution to its popularity.

References

Restaurants in Germany